Belli Kalungura is a 1992 Indian Kannada language film directed by K. V. Raju, starring Sunil and Malashri. The supporting cast features Tara, Chi. Guru Dutt, Avinash, Doddanna, Rockline Venkatesh and Girija Lokesh. The music was composed by Hamsalekha, also writing lyrics to four of its soundtracks. The film was a success during its time and is seen as a milestone in the career of Malashri, who would go on to appear in many successful films in the 1990s.

Cast
Sunil as Krishna
Malashri as Bhadra
Tara as Thunga
Chi. Guru Dutt
Avinash
Doddanna
Rockline Venkatesh
Girija Lokesh
 Venki
 Nagesh Yadav 
 K.S.Sridhar 
 Ananthrao maccheri 
 sadashiva brahmavar
 shiva kumar 
 killer venkatesh 
 Girish Rao 
 Master anand

Soundtrack

Hamsalekha composed the film's background score and music for the soundtracks, also writing its lyrics with Doddarange Gowda. The album consists of seven soundtracks.

References

1992 films
1990s Kannada-language films
Films scored by Hamsalekha